Saint Bonitus (623–710) was born in France and held a number of important positions including being appointed governor of Marseilles in 667 and Bishop of Auvergne.  He was also chancellor and referendary in Francia. He is venerated as a saint in the Catholic Church as well as the Eastern Orthodox Church.

Life
Bonitus was born in Auvergne, France and became chancellor to Sigebert III. the king of Austrasia; and by his zeal, religion, and justice, flourished in that kingdom under four kings. After the death of Dagobert II. Thierry III. made him governor of Marseilles and all Provence, in 680 
He was known to be an intimate friend of Sigebert III and Genesius.

His elder brother St. Avitus II. bishop of Clermont, in Auvergne, having recommended him for his successor, died in 689, and Bonitus was consecrated. He was known to have a great devotion to the Blessed Virgin Mary and is said to have experienced an apparition of her. Two years later, after having governed that see ten years, he had a scruple whether his election had been perfectly canonical; and having consulted St. Tilo, or Theau, then leading an eremitical life at Solignas, resigned his dignity.

He retired for four years to the abbey of Manlieu, and after having made a pilgrimage to Rome, died of the gout at Lyons on the fifteenth of January in 710, being eighty-six years old.

References 

 Catholic Online - Saint Bonitus

623 births
706 deaths
8th-century Frankish bishops
Bishops of Clermont
7th-century Frankish bishops
Bishops of Valence